Gödöllő is a town in Pest County, Budapest metropolitan area, Hungary, about  northeast from the outskirts of Budapest. Its population is 34,396 according to the 2010 census and is growing rapidly. It can be easily reached from Budapest with the suburban railway (HÉV), and national raiway (MÁV-START).

Gödöllő is home to the Szent István University, the main education institute of agriculture in Hungary. The palace at Gödöllő was originally built for the aristocratic Grassalkovich family; Franz Josef, Emperor of Austria and King of Hungary and his wife Elisabeth ("Sisi") later had their summer residence here.

Communism saw much of the town's original one-storey housing levelled to make way for the blocks of flats which continue to dominate the town centre, as well as much of the Royal Forest and Elisabeth's Park levelled for industrial use.

History

Stone Age
As far back as the Stone Age, this area was populated.

Ancient times
The earliest evidence of occupation is from the Roman period. The Devil's Dykes (Hungarian: Ördögárok) is situated south from Gödöllő. It is also known as the Csörsz árka ("Csörsz Ditch") or the Limes Sarmatiae (Latin for "Sarmatian border"), are several lines of Roman fortifications built mostly during the reign of Constantine I (312–337).

Middle Ages
The earliest available written data on the property rights in Gödöllő date from the early 14th century, at which time the town was separated from the larger community of Besnyő. The settlement was then owned by families of the lesser nobility. By the middle of the 15th century, Gödöllő developed into a village.

Turkish rule

After the disastrous defeat at Mohács in 1526, the invading Turkish troops occupied Buda and then Gödöllő, too. As a result of this, the population decreased to merely a few families. No data on property rights during the 160-year-long Turkish rule remain.

By the mid-17th century, Gödöllő again became a village. Its proprietor, Ferenc Hamvay, was the first owner who resided in the locality, in his country house in the village centre. At that time, the village consisted of a few houses with walls of wattle and daub and thatched roofs in addition to the mansion and the reform church.

Habsburg rule

A decisive turn in the life of Gödöllő was brought about by Antal Grassalkovich I (1694–1771), one of the most notable noblemen of 18th-century Hungary. Grassalkovich, born of an impoverished family of the minor nobility, began his career as a lawyer in 1715. A year later he was already working with the "Hofkammer" (the Royal Chamber, a body of the Habsburg financial administration in the 16–18th centuries). In 1727, he became president of the Commission of New Acquisitions (Neoaquistica Commissio), dealing with the revision and arrangement of the chaotic ownership rights after the Turkish rule. It was in this capacity that he first came across the estate of Gödöllő, whose then proprietress, Krisztina Bossányi, could verify her ownership rights.

Increasing in political power and wealth, Grassalkovich planned the development of a large estate, having its centre in Gödöllő. This became possible after the death of Krisztina Bossányi in 1737, when Grassalkovich successively purchased the properties from her heirs. He began to build his palatial residence as early as 1741, which, as the greatest Baroque manor house in Hungary, is even today the principal landmark of Gödöllő.

Grassalkovich, who curried favour with King Charles III and Queen Maria Theresa, also managed very successfully the properties of the treasury. For his economic and political abilities, he received first the title of baron and later on became a count.

He took meticulous care in making his properties profitable and in keeping them in good order. On his estates, he built 33 churches, including the church in the holy place of Máriabesnyő, and the chapel of the mansion house in Gödöllő. In the centre of Gödöllő, he had rows of houses built and settled German artisans and craftsmen there, thereby increasing the number of Roman Catholics alongside the Reformed population. He added a storey to Hamvay House and made it operate as a retreat. In public places, Baroque works of art were also made on his initiative (such as the Calvary, the Column of the Holy Virgin, and the statue of St. John of Nepomuk). Owing to his village-planning activities, Gödöllő became a country town in 1763, with the right of holding markets.

The son of Grassalkovich I, Antal Grassalkovich II (1734–1794), who was raised to the rank of prince, cared little for the estate. He leased out the properties one after the other, liquidated the household in Gödöllő and moved to Vienna. Following his death, the estate, heavily charged with debts, was inherited by his son, Antal Grassalkovich III. He continued to increase the debts and died without offspring, hence the properties were inherited on the female line.

At that time, the mansion house came to be the scene of an important political event. In the course of the spring campaign of the 1848-1849 War of Independence, the Hungarian soldiers gained a victory in Isaszeg on 6 April 1849. After this, Lajos Kossuth and his generals set up quarters in the mansion house of Gödöllő. Here a war council was held where the idea to dethrone the Habsburgs and to fight for Hungarian independence emerged.

In 1850, a banker, György Sina, purchased the estate of Gödöllő. He, and later his son, rarely stayed in Gödöllő; they considered the transaction merely a capital investment and in 1864 sold the whole of the property to a Belgian bank. The Hungarian state bought it back from this bank in March 1867 and gave it, together with the mansion house, to Francis Joseph I and Empress Elisabeth of Austria ("Sissi") as a coronation gift. From that time on, the royal family stayed in Gödöllő mainly in spring and autumn, and this resulted in a significant upswing in the life of the town.

The northern railway line, for instance, contrary to the original plan, passes close to Gödöllő because the royal summer resort was there. The gas factory, destined to produce the gas needed for the railway station and the royal mansion house, was accomplished by 1874. The number of artisans and small shopkeepers increased. Many of them were provided with work by the estate and the court. In 1869, the Gödöllő Savings Bank was established, its first shareholder being Francis Joseph I. The country town (that is, from 1864 on, a large village as an administrative division) grew into an increasingly popular summer resort, owing, in addition to the presence of the royal family, to its natural endowments and fresh air. Annually 300–400 families of Pest spent the summer season in Gödöllő, which was growing richer and richer with bathing places, restaurants, and village inns. The "Hotel Queen Elisabeth", established in the Hamvay mansion, became the scene of a teeming social life. The casino was open there and various social clubs and circles often organised their evening parties linked with theatrical performances.

The agrarian character of the village began to take shape at the tum of the century. The legal successors of the agricultural training institutes and model farms established in the territories of the royal demesne are still operating today. Besides, the number of artisans further increased since, partly because the royal summer resort was here; no big industry had settled in Gödöllő: A result of the transport development was the lengthening of the suburban ("HÉV") railway line, originally between Budapest and Kerepes, up to Gödöllő. This line still works well today.

Gödöllő at the turn of the century also wrote its name into the history book of Hungarian art. From 1901 to 1920, the only organised artists colony of the period of the Hungarian Sezession was working here.

This was the time when secondary school teaching started in the community. The Grammar School of the Minorites opened its gates in 1911. By 1924, the Grammar School of the Premonstratensian Order had also been built.

During the World Wars
In autumn 1918, in the "manor house" of the town, King Charles IV accepted the resignation of the Hungarian government.

Around this time the manor house was briefly occupied by Prime Minister Mihály Károlyi.

In 1919, military general staff of the Hungarian Soviet Republic had their headquarters in the manor house. 

Regent Miklós Horthy occupied the Royal Palace from 1920 until 1944.

4th World Scout Jamboree

Gödöllő in the area around the royal palace hosted the 4th World Scout Jamboree during 2–13 August 1933 at the Royal Forest of Gödöllő. A total of 25,792 scouts from 54 nations camped on the site. The Jamboree Camp Chief was the Chief Scout of Hungary, Count Teleki Pál, a member of the International Committee who had previously been and would later once again become Prime Minister of Hungary. The General Camp Manager was Vitez Kisbarnaki Ferenc Farkas, a general staff officer of the Hungarian Royal Army, who was later appointed the Chief Scout of Hungary on Teleki Pál's death in 1941. The scouts lived in ten sub-camps. The overall encampment was serviced by its own post office, ambulance station, hospital, a steam railway and station, an electric local tram line with four stations, radio service,  water supply with 9 wells, and an air-service.

This event was notable as the first international gathering where Air Scouts were represented, including the famous pilots, Hungarian László Almásy and Austrian Robert Kronfeld. In 1939 the royal park also hosted a jamboree of Girl Scouts.

Gödöllő and the Holocaust
Gödöllő has records of a Jewish population since the first half of the 19th century, suppliers to the court of Francis Joseph I since 1867. A synagogue was built in 1870, and a Jewish school operated from 1857 to 1944. The Jewish population was 195 in 1880, and 276 in 1930, after reaching a peak of 451 in 1920. After World War I, the Jews were severely persecuted, particularly after László Endre's 1923 appointment as district commissioner of the town.

The Jewish population of Gödöllő was deported to Auschwitz via Hatvan on 12 June 1944 as part of the so-called "emergency" deportations from Zala County and other parts of southern Hungary, rather than as part of the operations in Zones III and IV. Randolph L. Braham suggests this order came directly from Hungarian government circles, citing allegations that it was "to enable Miklós Horthy to walk around the town without having to see any Jews and to make it possible for him to personally experience the consequences of the anti-Jewish measures." The town was at this time the "summer residence" of Horthy, regent of Hungary.

Soviet Era
After World War II, the development of the community took a new turn. Soviet troops were stationed in part of the mansion house, while in a larger part there was a social welfare home. In contrast to its earlier character as a summer resort, industry started in Gödöllő. The first step in this direction was the building of the Ganz Factory of Electric Measuring Instruments in 1950, which was followed by other industrial plants. In the same year, the University of Agricultural Sciences moved into the buildings of the closed-down institute of the Premonstratensian. This meant the completion of the community's character as an agrarian centre and resulted in a further expansion of the network of agricultural institutions linked to the university.

The role of the ecclesiastical schools nationalised in 1948 was taken over by the general and secondary schools of the state. In 1951, the School of Apprentices started its activities and in 1955, the "Török Ignác" General State Grammar School began its work. The library of the community opened in 1955 and since then it has been extended with departments for children and for music.

On 1 January 1966, Gödöllő was promoted to the rank of a town. The present face of the town began to take shape at that time. The old rows of peasant houses disappeared one after the other, giving place to housing estates and public institutions.

In the cultural life of the town, a new era started in 1981 when the "Sándor Petőfi" Cultural Centre was inaugurated which, with its varied programmes, soon attained nationwide renown. During this decade, the town centre changed a lot. In the main square, a bank and a travel agency were built. Construction of a town hall was completed in 1986 (demolished 2018 to make way for a children's playground and public seating). Opposite this the new building of the grammar school was inaugurated in 1988. It was in this year that Hamvay House, which had held the collection of local history since 1978, received the rank of a museum. At the same time, the collection of mechanical machinery of the Agricultural University was opened.

Political changes which came about at the end of the 1980s and the beginning of the 1990s brought about significant changes in the life of Gödöllő, too. Some of the industrial projects settled here in the 1950s closed, while others which were viable were privatised. The number of industrial and service units in private ownership increased and quickly transformed the appearance of the town.

The influence of the changes also made itself felt in education. The church schools restarted their activities. In 1989, the Capuchins and the Salvator Sisters received back their monasteries; in 1990, the Premonstratensian returned to Gödöllő and, after having opened their school, built their church in 1993.

After Communism

In 1990, after the departure of the Soviet troops, the process of renovating the almost ruined Grassalkovich mansion house began, and although work continues, the majority of the Royal Palace is open to visitors as a museum and concert venue.

During the 2011 Hungarian EU Presidency, informal international ministerial meetings were held in the Royal Palace. The main venues were the Baroque Palace's riding school and the reconstructed stables.

The town hosted The 10th ASEM Foreign Ministers' Meeting, an interregional forum of the 27 members of the European Union, the European Commission, the 10 members of the ASEAN Secretariat, China, Japan, and the Republic of Korea, India, Mongolia, Pakistan, Australia, Russia, New Zealand, Bangladesh, Norway and Switzerland.

In 2016 (July 28 through August 6), Gödöllő hosted the Men's 2016 European Lacrosse Championships. The championships consisted of 24 European nations. The matches for the tournaments were held on the ground of Szent István University.

Geography

It lies in the Gödöllő Hill Region.

Gödöllő is bordered on the south by the town of Isaszeg, on the east through the forest by the village of Domony, on the west through the other forest by the town of Kerepes, and on the north by Szada.

The Arboretum of Gödöllő, called Franz Joseph Arboretum in the beginning, was established in 1902 on 190 hectares (469ac) of land; the installation completed in 1914. Before World War II, it was considered as the most significant arboretum in Hungary. The town began to expand it in 1960, and today operates 350 hectares (864ac). 90% of the forest is for research purposes and the other 10% is a park.

This area is also home to the town's museum of beekeeping (Méhészeti Múzeum).

Parks
Compared to the size of the town, it has many parks, but there are only four large ones.
 Erzsébet Park (park of Empress Elisabeth of Austria)
 Kastély Park (park of the palace)
 Alsó Park (downtown park)
 Egyetemi Park (university park)

Neighborhoods

 Town Centre
 Antalhegy
 Blaha
 Csanak
 Haraszt
 Kertváros
 Királytelep
 Máriabesnyő
 Alvég
 Fenyves
 Nagyfenyves
 Egyetem (University), Fácános
 Incső
 Marikatelep

Climate
The town has a temperate, transitional climate – somewhere between the mild, snowy weather of Transdanubia, the variable continental climate and the almost sub-Mediterranean weather of the south.

Demographics

The town's population has grown significantly since the 1990s. Many people move away from the capital city, Budapest, and settle in Gödöllő.

Ethnicity
The following table shows the ethnic distribution of Gödöllő in the 2001 census.

In the town Gypsy, Greek, Polish, German and Ruthenian minority formed government.

Religion
The following table shows the religious distribution of Gödöllő in the 2001 census.

Politics

Between 1990 and 2010, representatives were elected from 14 constituencies into the representative body, and another 9 people got in from a compensation list, which consisted of a total 23 people. The amended legislation in 2010 reduced the number of constituencies to 10, the number of obtainable seats from the compensation list to 4, so the new council contains 14 people.

The mayor has two deputies, who are elected from the representatives.

The town has established several business organizations which are providing public services, such as district heating networks, the town market, and the House of Arts, furthermore the public catering, waste management and general urban management tasks.

Mayors and council presidents
György Gémesi (1990–)
István Papp (1983–1990)
György Ritecz (1982–1983)
János Benedek (1971–1982)
Tibor Galicz (1967–1971)
József Gyetvai (1966–1967)

Economy
The Hungarian chemical company BorsodChem established in 2008 a technical support and R&D centre in Gödöllő. The British pharmaceutical company GlaxoSmithKline has been operating its vaccine plant in the town since 2006. The American technology company, Itron has its own R&D centre there since 2017. The Hungarian flavour and essential oils manufacturer FOOD BASE, the Hungarian chemical company Chemico, the Italian blood plasma distributor Kedrion, the American cosmetics company Avon and the American vehicle manufacturer Caterpillar Inc. have production facilities in Gödöllő.

Transport

Gödöllő is a transportation hub, because of the 3 main road and the M3 motorway cuts through the town, and the M31 motorway connects them with the eastern section of the M0 ring road. In addition, there are minor roads running from the town to Vác, Pécel and Jászberény.

The Budapest-Sátoraljaújhely-rail line is also affected, as well as the BKV H8, suburban train terminal is located here.

Gödöllő has nine local bus lines and is a common stop for long-distance buses.

Motorways
 M3
 M31

Railways
Budapest-Hatvan railway line
The suburban railway of Gödöllő (HÉV)

Airport
Gödöllő has a small sport airport.

Sights

Royal Palace of Gödöllő

The Royal Palace of Gödöllő is one of the most important, largest monuments of Hungarian palace architecture. it is a Baroque building on the area of 1,700 m² with a park of 28 ha. It is famous for being a favourite place of Queen Elisabeth of Hungary.

Main square

Gödöllő's main square, Szabadság Tér (Liberty Square), is reached with a short walk from the suburban train (HEV) stop of the same name. Its sights are: right from Dózsa György Road: the Queen Elizabeth Hotel, Reformed Church (9 Szabadság Square), town hall (7 Szabadság Square), the World Peace Gong (right side of the town hall), Hamvay Mansion (5 Szabadság Square), Gödöllő Town Museum (5 Szabadság Square), town market and the Pelican Well (5 Szabadság Square).

As a part of the New Hungary Development Plan, the town's main square has been completely renovated, with work completed in 2011, in an attempt to restore the atmosphere of the town to that of the time prior to the Socialist Party's building programme, which demolished much of the town centre to make way for blocks of flats. As part of the renovation, the square has been pedestrianised, 46 Secession era-style street lights added, and a singing fountain built in front of the Reformed Church.

Reformed Church

The baroque-style Reformed Church, built in 1745, is an onion dome church with a beautifully simple façade. The building process was patronized; the money and the plot for the church were donated by Antal Grassalkovich I who had demolished a Reformed Church built in 1657 at the site of the present Royal Castle. The new church was consecrated in 1745. It was renovated several times: in 1912, the complete painted and carved wooden ceiling and the chancel were changed into concrete. The prang in 1945 affected the church seriously and the renovation processes took very long. The renovation of the tower was finished in 1993.

World Peace Gong

The World Peace Gong on the Szabadság (Liberty) Square is the fifth in the world and the first and only European peace gong which was given by Indonesia as a present and a symbol of worldwide friendship and fraternity to the town of Gödöllő. The gong shows the flags of all the countries, the symbols of all the religions and the maps of the oceans of the Earth. It was created by the World Peace Committee as a memento for the bomb attack in Bali in 2002. The gong was offered to Gödöllő in 2007 as an acknowledgement of advances in civilization, technology and economy as well as the peaceful social circumstances in Gödöllő. The gong weighs 150 kg; it is a 2m diameter bronze circle relic, the work of Djuyoto Suntani, an Indonesian sculptor. The gong was inaugurated on 2 May 2007. The story of the gong is engraved in the small plaque in front and the park around it is populated with shrub species typically found in the Tropics. The gong remains in excellent condition, apart from the scratching out, prior to 2009, of the Israeli flag.

Hamvay Mansion
The mansion, a one-story characteristic baroque building in the town centre, recalls Gödöllő's baroque era with its typical yellow color, wrought-iron lamps, and the inner garden with its arcade. Ferenc Hamvay, landed lord of Gödöllő, built this mansion (a ground level building at the time) in 1662.

In the 18th century, it was rebuilt and became a one-storey building when Antal Grassalkovich I made it a guest house. Then it fulfilled a number of functions, including Gödöllő's first pharmacy in 1814. Some of the ceiling decorations in the interiors of the ground floor are probably left from that time. In the 19th century, it became the hotel bearing the name of Queen Elizabeth of Hungary. From this time on, the hotel was the venue for numerous cultural and artistic events like theatre performances, and it hosted a casino and a number of balls in its ballroom. The Commemorative Room arranged in 1927 in the school operating in the building until 1988 is home to a collection of souvenirs of Gödöllő's history and cultural life. In 1978, another collection on local history was exhibited, the successor of which came to be the Town Museum Gödöllő. The Hamvay Mansion and the market in its garden were renovated in 1998–99; the works were awarded numerous national and international prizes.

Town market
The modern town market is a lively place. Open on weekday mornings through the early afternoon, it includes outdoor and indoor stands selling fresh produce, flowers, and local craft work, with some stall holders wearing traditional dress. The market has several cafes and a bar.

The Pelican Well
At the main entrance to the town market stands the Pelican Well; it includes a design featuring a pelican feeding its young with its own blood.

Education

Nurseries
 1st Nursery (Palotakert)
 2nd Nursery (Kossuth Lajos Street)
 3rd Nursery (Premontrei Road)

Kindergartens
Municipal kindergartens
 Martinovics utcai Óvoda
 Szent János utcai Óvoda
 Kazinczy körúti Óvoda
 Palotakerti Óvoda
 Tisza utcai Óvoda
 Táncsics Mihály úti Óvoda
 Egyetem téri Óvoda
 Zöld Óvoda

Privately run kindergartens
 Játékkuckó Magánóvoda
 Gödöllő Szabad Waldorf Óvoda
 Stefi Néni Óvodája
 Tudásfa Tanoda Alapítványi Óvoda
 Mókus Odú Gyermekóvoda

Elementary schools
Municipal schools
 Erkel Ferenc Elementary School
 Hajós Alfréd Elementary School
 Damjanich János Elementary School
 Petőfi Sándor Elementary School
 Montágh Imre Elementary School, Special Vocational School and Vocational School of Advanced Skills

Church and public elementary schools
 Szent Imre Catholic Elementary School
 Gödöllői Waldorf Elementary School and Secondary Grammar School and Primary Art School

Secondary schools
Municipal secondary schools
 Török Ignác Secondary Grammar School
 Madách Imre Secondary School, Vocational School and College

Church and public secondary schools
 Gödöllői Premontrei Szent Norbert Secondary Grammar School and Church Music Secondary School and College
 Gödöllői Református Líceum Secondary Grammar School and College
 Gödöllői Waldorf Elementary School and Secondary Grammar School and Primary Art School

Other educational institutions
 Frédéric Chopin Music School
 Summer Day
 Educational Advisory
 Institute for School and Speech Therapy
 Single Teaching Field Service

Szent István University

The university headquarters are located in the picturesque Gödöllő, but altogether nine faculties and an institution accept students in Budapest, Jászberény, Békéscsaba, Szarvas, and Gyula. Most of the schools in Szent István University have one or even two-century long histories. SZIU is Hungary's largest agricultural higher educational institution.

More than 18,000 students study in the seven campuses of the university. In addition to conventional agricultural and environmental sciences, Szent István University offers courses in veterinary medicine, environmental sciences, mechanical engineering, economy and social sciences, architecture, water supply management, medical sciences, and applied arts.

Amerigo Tot's "The Apotheosis of the Nucleus"
Amerigo Tot is a sculptor of Hungarian origin. His copper relief created on an imposing 120 square metres entitled "The Apotheosis of the Nucleus" can be seen in the University Hall of the Faculty of Technical Studies.
"I wanted to show the apotheosis of the nucleus in copper...The nucleus, he said, is a general thought. It is the grain for the plant and the beginning for biology as well.' Theoretically grain and soil and woman go together..." said Tot about the theoretical background of the relief. His work was originally designed for the gate of Saint Peter's Basilica in Rome. The first design was ready in 1970 but, due to a series of historical events it was only inaugurated in 1983 in the presence of the artist, who was by then seriously ill.

Museum of Agricultural Machinery
The museum hosts the second largest collection of agricultural machinery in the world. On its 6,000 square meters, it is home to a collection of more than 2,000 agricultural machines that are still working. Six exhibitions introduce agricultural machinery and curiosities in the history of agricultural techniques. The visitor will be introduced to the 2.5 million year-old history of food acquisition and production, through models reconstructed with the help of original designs and machines. It is a true adventure of understanding mankind's tough fight for the daily bread. The exhibitions show the development of the machines from very early times like wind, water and steam powered agricultural machines, to modern ones used today. Some 200 agricultural models show the development of food producing machinery together with documentation on the technical history of the respective time.

Hungaricums (traditional Hungarian food types) are on display here: more than 300 types of food introduce the traditional food of Hungarians arranged in a thematic order according to region. The complete history of Hungarian agricultural production is explained in an exhibition in which the visitor can see soil cultivating machines, plant cultivating machines and those for animal husbandry used by ploughmen in earlier times, as well as modern machines used today.

Twin towns – sister cities

Gödöllő is twinned with:

 Giessen, Germany (1988)
 Forssa, Finland (1990)
 Miercurea Ciuc, Romania (1990)

 Wageningen, Netherlands (1992)
 Senta, Serbia (1994)
 Dunajská Streda, Slovakia (1994)
 Laxenburg, Austria (1997)
 Turnhout, Belgium (1999)
 Żywiec, Poland (2002)
 Aichach, Germany (2006)
 Valdemoro, Spain (2008)
 Brandýs nad Labem-Stará Boleslav, Czech Republic (2009)
 Bogor, Indonesia (2009)
 Bad Ischl, Austria (2012)
 Zhangzhou, China (2013)
 Beit Aryeh-Ofarim, Israel (2015)

Notable people
 

József Ángyán, professor, agricultural engineer and politician
Miklós Baranyai, physician and politician, member of the National Assembly (MP)
Behnam Lotfi, musician, member of Compact Disco
József Dzurják, football player and manager
Elisabeth of Austria, empress
Franz Joseph I of Austria, emperor and monarch
Károly Grósz, communist politician, Prime Minister of Hungary (1987–1988)
Noémi Kiss, writer
István Medgyaszay, architect and writer
Dénes Mihály, inventor and engineer
Kornél Mundruczó, actor and film director
Dániel Nagy, footballer
Gyula J. Obádovics, mathematician
Géza Ottlik, writer, translator, mathematician and theorist
Sándor Petőfi, poet and liberal revolutionary (lived in Gödöllő for the summer of 1843)
Tibor Rab, footballer
Vilmos Szabadi, violinist
Ignác Török, honvéd general in the Hungarian army, one of the 13 Martyrs of Arad
Krisztina Tóth, table tennis player
Péter Tusor, university associate history professor
Victor Vashi, political cartoonist
Theodore Wolfner, deputy in the Austro-Hungarian Monarch
Zita of Bourbon-Parma, princess
János Zováth, footballer

In cinema
 Parts of the 1999 British-American film Au Pair take place in Gödöllő.
 In 1900, Aleksandar Lifka shot the visit of the Emperor Franz Joseph and Queen Elisabeth to the town of Gödöllő.
 Several scenes were shot at the Gödöllő Railway Station in the Citizen X (1995).
 Mata Hari, American-Hungarian film (1985)

Media
Rádióaktiv 93.6
Gödöllői Szolgálat (weekly)
Gödöllői Hírek (appears every two weeks)

Gallery

References

External links

 in Hungarian and English
Gödöllő Airport's Website
Aerial photographs of Gödöllő
Szent István University
Museum of Agricultural Machinery
The History of Gödöllő

 
Budapest metropolitan area
Tourism in Hungary
Baroque architecture in Hungary